Kebakko is a type of ready-meal in Finland. Kebakkos are very similar to meatballs in Finland. It consists of meat, breadcrumbs, onions, eggs, and spices. The difference is mostly in shape; instead of a ball, kebakko is a piece of meat about 12 cm in length on a wooden stick, and is usually sold in packs of four to twelve. The name comes from the Turkish food kebab, and the Finnish word kepakko, meaning "small stick."

Kebakko represents fusion cuisine. It combines the Turkish kebab with traditional Finnish meatloaf. The usual way to serve kebakkos is to heat them and serve them with various sauces for dipping; the stick enables the kebakkos to be dipped and eaten by hand.

References

Skewered kebabs
Barbecue
Finnish cuisine